Golovinsky (masculine), Golovinskaya (feminine), or Golovinskoye (neuter) may refer to:

Golovinsky (rural locality) (Golovinskaya, Golovinskoye), several rural localities in Russia
Golovinsky District, a district in Northern Administrative Okrug of the federal city of Moscow, Russia
Matvei Golovinski (Matvey Golovinsky, 1865–1920), Russian-French writer, journalist, and political activist

See also
Golovin (disambiguation)
Golovino (disambiguation)